Hockley, Virginia may refer to:
Hockley, Gloucester County, Virginia
Hockley, King and Queen County, Virginia